Matlock Riverside was the terminus of Peak Rail, a preserved steam railway of approximately  in length. For many years Peak Rail had planned to run trains into Matlock station, shared with the main line from Derby (the Derwent Valley Line).

The station was built in 1991 due to problems negotiating with British Rail to run into the station at Matlock at that time. In 2008 Peak Rail negotiated a 50-year lease to run into Platform 2 at Matlock. Track layout adjustments and refurbishment of the Matlock down platform followed and In July 2011 Peak Rail commencing running services into Matlock station. At the time it was announced that Matlock Riverside was being retained for special events and demonstration goods trains. It has also been used for winter trains.

The station itself is a temporary wooden construction, and was previously used at Chee Dale Halt near Buxton when Peak Rail was based at Buxton in the 1980s. Due to operating complications at the Buxton end of the route, Peak Rail moved south to Darley Dale near Matlock, and the former Chee Dale Halt was re-used, forming Matlock Riverside.

The station consists of one platform, situated on the Up (east) side of the former deviation, whilst the Down line was used as a run-round loop, which permits the use of a single locomotive on services (although top-and-tail operation occurred on Special Event Days). The current connection to Matlock station branches from the Down side of the line so it is not possible for a train to call at both Matlock Riverside and Matlock stations.

For a time, Matlock Riverside possessed a small hut that functioned as a Ticket Office. After this was frequently damaged by local vandals, however, the station became permanently unstaffed with tickets required to be purchased aboard the train.

External links 
 
 Peak Rail website

Heritage railway stations in Derbyshire
Railway stations built for UK heritage railways
Matlock, Derbyshire